The name Diana was used for two tropical cyclones in the Atlantic Ocean, four in the Eastern Pacific Ocean and two European windstorms.

In the Atlantic:
Hurricane Diana (1984) – Category 4 hurricane, struck North Carolina
Hurricane Diana (1990) – Category 2 hurricane, struck Yucatán and Veracruz, Mexico
Diana was retired from the Atlantic list following 1990, and was replaced with Dolly in the 1996 season.

In the Eastern Pacific:
Hurricane Diana (1960)– Category 1 hurricane, brushed southern Baja California Peninsula 
Tropical Storm Diana (1968)– remained over the open ocean
Hurricane Diana (1972) – Category 2 hurricane, dissipated near the Hawaiian Islands
Hurricane Diana (1976)– Category 2 hurricane, never threatened land

Diana has not been used in the Eastern Pacific since the four-year lists were replaced following the 1997 season.

Southwest Pacific:
 Cyclone Diana (1978)

European windstorms:
Storm Diana (2018)– affected Portugal
Storm Diana (2022)– affected Italy

Atlantic hurricane set index articles
Pacific hurricane set index articles